W. M. Mendis and Company, is a Sri Lankan beverage alcohol company, with its headquarters in Negombo, Sri Lanka. It is as known one of Sri Lanka's oldest and most renowned liquor manufacturers in Sri Lanka. Considered as one of the pioneers in the field, it still ranks as one of Sri Lanka's largest distillers. 

Mendis produces an array of products, including pure coconut arracks, blended arracks, old arracks and foreign liquors, Several of these spirits are for export markets overseas, including Australia, Germany, India, Malaysia, Maldives, Nepal, Singapore, the United Kingdom, and the United States. The company was formerly listed on the Colombo Stock Exchange.

The company resumed operations in November 2022.

History

Change in Ownership
In 2011, Arjun Aloysius acquired the controlling stake in Mendis, through Perpetual Capital Ltd, the value was reportedly over Rs. 1 billion.

2018-2021
Mendis lost their license to produce liquor in 2018, due to non-payment of government taxes, and was unable to operate for a long period.

In 2021, Mendis was allowed to restart operations, but almost instantly in a week, the President of Sri Lanka, Gotabaya Rajapaksa, decided to reverse this decision.

2022
On 19 April 2022, the People's Bank acquired Mendis' distillery in Aluthgama, after the company defaulted on its debt repayments. The distillery was valued at over Rs. 250 million.

Resumed Operations - Starting from November 2022, Mendis resumed operations.

Main brands
 Blenders choice whisky
 Island rum
 London spice dry gin
 Mendis coconut arrack
 Rusalka Vodka

See also
 Arrack

References

Further reading

External links

 
Food and drink companies established in 1947
Drink companies of Sri Lanka
Food and drink companies
1947 establishments in Ceylon
Sri Lankan brands
Companies formerly listed on the Colombo Stock Exchange